Gordaliza del Pino, Gordaliza del Pinu in Leonese language, is a small town located in the province of León, Castile and León, Spain. According to the 2010 census (INE), the municipality has a population of 304 inhabitants.

References

Municipalities in the Province of León